Yanahuanca is a town in central Peru, capital of the province Daniel Alcídes Carrión in the region Pasco.

Etymology
The name of the town, is a phrase composed by the Quechua adjective yana (black), and the Runasimi noun wanka ("huanca" in Spanish) that means "demarcatory stone", among other meanings; for what "yanahuanca" would be understood as "black stone".

References

External links
Satellite map at Maplandia

Populated places in the Pasco Region